Stokke may refer to:
 Stokke, a municipality in the county of Vestfold, Norway
 Stokke Station, a railway station in Stokke, Norway
 Stokke AS, a Norwegian children's furniture and accessories company
 Lisa Stokke, a Norwegian singer and actress
 Allison Stokke, American pole vaulter and fitness model